The Tumpat railway station is a Malaysian railway station stationed at and named after the town of Tumpat, Kelantan. It is also the northern terminus of KTM's East Coast Line.

In 2018, Tumpat station begins to upgrade project and build the depot. Tumpat train station will also be upgraded to accommodate an estimated passenger capacity of 1,500 people per day. The upgrade work of the railway station will involve the construction of a new building, an existing platform level, a full roof and a footbridge. The depot will be built with an area of 4.7 hectares to accommodate 13 units artificiality rail Diesel Multiple Units (DMU).

Train services
 Ekspres Rakyat Timuran 26/27 Tumpat–JB Sentral
 Shuttle Timur 51/52/57/60 Tumpat–Gua Musang
 Shuttle Timur 55/56 Tumpat–Dabong

Around the station
 Tumpat railway depot

References

KTM East Coast Line stations
Railway stations opened in 1948
Railway stations in Kelantan
Tumpat District